Gbarpolu-3 is an electoral district for the elections to the House of Representatives of Liberia. The constituency covers Kongba District, Gbarma District as well as the Gbelleta community of Bopolu District.

Elected representatives

References

Electoral districts in Liberia